Abdelkader Besseghir (born May 3, 1978, in Mascara) is a retired Algerian footballer. He retired from football in 2015.

References

1978 births
Algerian footballers
Algerian Ligue Professionnelle 1 players
GC Mascara players
Living people
MC Alger players
RC Kouba players
USM Alger players
People from Mascara, Algeria
Association football defenders
21st-century Algerian people